The University of Science and Technology of Benin is a private university in Benin, whose headquarters are located in the district of Kpondéhou in Cotonou, the economic capital of Benin.

History

Founded in October 1996 by Professor Frédéric Dohou, the "Université des Sciences et Technologies du Bénin" is a university institution for scientific, cultural and professional character, enjoying corporate personality, pedagogical and scientific, administrative and financial autonomy. 
It contributes to the missions of higher education and scientific research through six faculties and five specialized higher schools.

The USTB is a member institution of the Network of Universities of Science and Technology of the Countries of Africa south of the Sahara.

Organization
The USTB has six faculties, five specialized higher schools and one research centre:

List of Faculties
Faculty of Legal, Administrative and Political
Faculty of Economics
Faculty of Management Sciences
Faculty of Fundamental and Applied Sciences
Faculty of Letters, Arts and Social Sciences
Faculty of Agricultural Sciences
Faculty of Computer Sciences

List of specialized Higher Schools
 Higher School of Management and Business Administration (ESMAE)
 Higher School of Communication (ESCOM)
 Higher School of Industrial Technology (ESTI)
 Higher School of Applied Informatics (ESIA)
 Higher School of Public Works, Mines and Geology (ESTPMG)

Research Centre
 Consortium for the management of basic and applied research in Africa south of the Sahara

International relations
Since its inception, the USTB has worked to develop a network of international cooperation with foreign universities, including with the University of Poitiers.

References 

Universities in Benin
Cotonou
Educational institutions established in 1996
1996 establishments in Benin